The Shalun Smart Green Energy Science City is an industrial park in Gueiren District, Tainan, Taiwan.

History
The development of the industrial park started on 27 October 2016 after the Executive Yuan approved the plan. On 6 November the same year, the Shalun Smart Green Energy Science City office was established. The groundbreaking ceremony for the industrial park construction was held on 30 March 2018 in a ceremony attended by Premier William Lai.

Organizational structures
 General Affairs Division
 R&D and Planning Division
 Demo and Promotion Division
 Regional Construction Division

Transportation
The industrial park is accessible within walking distance from Tainan Station of Taiwan High Speed Rail.

See also
 Ministry of Science and Technology (Taiwan)

References

External links
 

2018 establishments in Taiwan
Buildings and structures in Tainan
Science parks in Taiwan